Conghua District, alternately romanized as Tsungfa, is one of 11 urban districts and the northernmost district of the prefecture-level city of Guangzhou, the capital of Guangdong Province, China. Conghua connects the Pearl River Delta with the mountainous area of northern Guangdong. Within China, it is known for its hot springs and lychees. Its GDP was RMB10.369 billion (US$2,360 per person).

History
It was subsequently upgraded to county-level city status and then, on 12 February 2014, to an urban district of Guangzhou.

Administrative divisions

Climate

See also
 Conghua city yueyuan animal breeding farm
 Guangzhou
 Wenquan, Guangdong

Notes

References

Citations

Bibliography
 .

External links
Official website of Guangdong Province
Official website of Conghua Government
 Guangzhou International Website - English version
Lychee Festival

Districts of Guangzhou